The Governor of Oahu was the royal governor or viceroy of the island of Oahu in the Kingdom of Hawaii. The Governor of Oahu resided at Honolulu and was usually a Hawaiian chief or prince and could even be a woman. The governor had authority over the island of Oahu and Honolulu, the kingdom's capital, and it was up to the governor to appoint lieutenant governors to assist them. The governor had replaced the old alii aimokus of the islands, but sovereignty remained with the king. The island governors were under the jurisdiction of the Ministers of the Interiors. Either the governor or the monarch had the power to call in foreign assistance in time of troubles. This occurred a few times, including the uprising of the Emmaites in 1874 when John Owen Dominis called for British and American assistance. Neither the governor nor monarch called for foreign assistance in January 1893 when John L. Stevens sent American troops into Honolulu.

Role 
In the 1840 Constitution of the Kingdom of Hawaii it states:
There shall be four governors over these Hawaiian Islands - one for Hawaii - one for Maui and the Islands adjacent - one for Oahu, and one for Kauai and the adjacent Islands. All the governors, from Hawaii to Kauai shall be subject to the King.

The prerogatives of the governors and their duties, shall be as follows: Each governor shall have the general direction of the several tax gatherers of his island, and shall support them in the execution of all their orders which he considers to have been properly given, but shall pursue a course according to law, and not according to his own private views. He also shall preside over all the judges of his island, and shall see their sentences executed as above. He shall also appoint the judges and give them their certificates of office.

All the governors, from Hawaii to Kauai shall be subject not only to the King, but also to the Premier.

The governor shall be the superior over his particular island or islands. He shall have charge of the munitions of war, under the direction of the King, however, and the Premier. He shall have charge of the forts, the soldiery, the arms and all the implements of war. He shall receive the government dues and shall deliver over the same to the Premier. All important decisions rest with him in times of emergency, unless the King or Premier be present. He shall have charge of all the King's business on the island, the taxation, new improvements to be extended, and plans for the increase of wealth, and all officers shall be subject to him. He shall also have power to decide all questions, and transact all island business which is not by law assigned to others.

When either of the governors shall decease, then all the chiefs shall assemble at such place as the King shall appoint, and shall nominate a successor of the deceased governor, and whosoever they shall nominate and be approved by the King, he shall be the new governor.

Abolishment
After King Kalākaua was forced to sign the Bayonet Constitution in 1887, the island governorships began to be viewed as wasteful expenses for the monarchy. The governors and governesses at the time (who were mainly royals or nobles) were also viewed unfit to appoint the native police forces and condemned for "their refusal to accept their removal or reform by sheriffs or the marshal". The island governorships were abolished by two acts: the first act, on December 8, 1887, transferred the power of the police appointment to the island sheriffs, and the second, An Act To Abolish The Office Of Governor,  which officially abolished the positions, on August 23, 1888. King Kalākaua refused to approve the 1888 act, but his veto was overridden by two-thirds of the legislature. These positions were restored under the An Act To Establish A Governor On Each Of The Islands Of Oahu, Maui, Hawaii and Kauai on November 14, 1890, with the effective date of January 1, 1891. One significant change was this act made it illegal for a woman to be governor ending the traditional practice of appointing female royals and nobles as governess. Kalākaua died prior to reappointing any of the island governors, but his successor Liliuokalani restored the positions at different dates between 1891 and 1892. After the overthrow of the Kingdom of Hawaii, the Provisional Government of Hawaii repealed the 1890 act and abolished these positions on February 28, 1893 for the final time.

List of governors of Oahu

See also
List of governors of Hawaii
Governors of Hawaii (island)
 Governors of Kauai
 Governors of Maui
Alii Aimoku of Oahu
Mayor of Honolulu

References

 
Oahu